Methacrolein, or methacrylaldehyde, is an unsaturated aldehyde.  It is a clear, colorless, flammable liquid.

Methacrolein is one of two major products resulting from the reaction of isoprene with OH in the atmosphere, the other product being methyl vinyl ketone (MVK, also known as butenone). These compounds are important components of the atmospheric oxidation chemistry of biogenic chemicals, which can result in the formation of ozone and/or particulates. Methacrylaldehyde is also present in cigarette smoke. It can  be found in the essential oil of the plant Big Sagebrush (Artemisia tridentata) which contains 5% methacrolein. 

Industrially, the primary use of methacrolein is in the manufacture of polymers and synthetic resins.

Exposure to methacrolein is highly irritating to the eyes, nose, throat and lungs.

See also
 Acrolein
 Methacrylic acid

References

External links
 Hazardous Substance Fact Sheet

Alkenals
Monomers
Enones